The following lists events that happened during 1893 in Australia.

Incumbents

Premiers
Premier of New South Wales – George Dibbs
Premier of South Australia – John Downer (until 16 June) then Charles Kingston
Premier of Queensland – Samuel Griffith (until 27 March), Thomas McIlwraith (until 27 October) then Hugh Nelson
Premier of Tasmania – Henry Dobson
Premier of Western Australia – John Forrest
Premier of Victoria – William Shiels (until 23 January) then James Patterson

Governors
Governor of New South Wales – Victor Child Villiers, 7th Earl of Jersey until March, then Robert Duff 
Governor of Queensland – Henry Wylie Norman 
Governor of South Australia – Algernon Keith-Falconer, 9th Earl of Kintore 
Governor of Tasmania – Jenico Preston, 14th Viscount Gormanston
Governor of Victoria – John Hope, 1st Marquess of Linlithgow 
Governor of Western Australia – William C. F. Robinson

Events
 30 January – The Federal Bank collapses, starting the Australian banking crisis of 1893.
 4 February – 1893 Brisbane flood devastates Queensland.
 14 June – Gold discovered at Kalgoorlie, Western Australia by Paddy Hannan and two others.
 Queensland is granted its Coat of Arms
 Coolgardie and Esperance are both declared as towns
 Archduke Franz Ferdinand of Austria spends time hunting kangaroos and emus in Australia

Arts and literature

Sport
 Tarcoola wins the Melbourne Cup
 Victoria wins the inaugural Sheffield Shield

Births
 10 January – Albert Jacka (died 1932), recipient of the Victoria Cross
 11 January – Charles "Chook" Fraser (died 1981), rugby league footballer and coach
 13 January – Roy Cazaly (died 1963), Australian Rules footballer
 8 October – William Morrison (died 1961), Governor General of Australia
 2 December – Raphael Cilento (died 1985), medical administrator
 9 December – Ivo Whitton (died 1967), golfer

Deaths
 4 September – Francis William Adams, writer (born 1862)
 17 October – Josiah Howell Bagster, land agent and politician (born 1847)

Footnotes

 
Australia
Years of the 19th century in Australia